The Clean Clothes Campaign (CCC) is the garment industry's largest alliance of labour unions and non-governmental organizations. The civil society campaign focuses on the improvement of working conditions in the garment and sportswear industries. Formed in the Netherlands in 1989, the CCC has campaigns in 15 European countries: Austria, Belgium (North and South), Denmark, Finland, France, Germany, Italy, Ireland, Netherlands, Norway, Poland, Spain, Sweden, Switzerland and the United Kingdom. The CCC works with a partner network of more than 250 organizations around the world.

Structure
The national branches of the CCC are autonomous organizations of consumer groups, trade unions, human and women's rights organizations, researchers and activists. Representatives from each national campaign meet three times a year to coordinate international activities.

Activities

Retailers and distributors
The Clean Clothes Campaign insists that companies bear a responsibility and have the power to ensure that workers throughout their supply chains are treated fairly. The CCC has developed a "Code of Labour Practices for the Apparel Industry Including Sportswear" based upon the conventions of the United Nations' International Labour Organization. The principles set forth in this code include, among others, a minimum employment age, safe working requirements, set working hours and right to a living wage. The CCC pressures retailers and manufacturers to adopt the Code of Labour Practices and ensure that the principles are upheld.

Successful campaigning by the CCC has led many businesses to adopt “codes of conduct,” a list of standards for suppliers. The CCC pushes companies to give these codes real meaning by reinforcing them with a commitment to monitoring conditions and resolving problems. The CCC also presses companies to ensure that their buying practices, such as pricing and delivery schedules, do not make it unfeasible for factories to provide decent work.

Support to workers
The Clean Clothes Campaign provides solidarity support in urgent cases of labor and human rights violations. The CCC communicates with companies and public authorities, requesting positive intervention and resolution. If companies fail to take adequate steps to resolve problems, the CCC mobilizes consumers and activists around the world to take action. The CCC has taken up more than 250 cases involving discrimination against union members and officials, unsafe working conditions, withholding of wages and social premiums, violence against workers, and violations of worker's human rights.

Consumer education
The CCC publicizes through educational programmes, demonstrations, advertisement, debates, books, rallies and news outlets information related to the production of clothes and the misuse of garment workers.

The artist Siobhan Wall became the campaign's artist in residence where she curated The Clothes She Wears; a collection of clothes worn by eight women working in the garment industry. The show toured to Paris, Worthing, Ghent, and Utrecht as well as the Royal Geographical Society and The Fashion and Textile Museum in London.

Legal advocacy
The Clean Clothes Campaign calls on the European Union and national governments to promote respect for international labour standards. It lobbies governments to be responsible consumers themselves by committing to the ethical procurement of government uniforms and work wear.

Partners 
 Switzerland: Public Eye

See also 
 United Students Against Sweatshops
 Fairwear Australia
 Labour law
 Labor rights
 Sweatshop
 International Labour Organization conventions
 Christian Initiative Romero
 Child labor

References

External links 
Official website
Clean Clothes Campaign summoned to Indian court in alleged defamation case

Fair trade organizations
Organisations based in Amsterdam